Nikola Mišković (born 25 January 1999) is a Serbian professional basketball player who last played for Apollon Patras of the Greek Basket League.

Early life 
Mišković was born in Poland, as his father Dejan Mišković was playing for AZS UMK Toruń of the Polish Basketball League. Also, his father played for the Crvena zvezda and many other teams around Europe.

Mišković played the Euroleague Basketball Next Generation Tournaments for the Mega Leks U18 (2015–2017). On April 17, 2015, he participated at 2015 Jordan Brand Classic International Game in Brooklyn, New York.

Professional career 
On 30 January 2017, Mišković signed the first professional contract with the Mega Bemax. In February 2018, he was loaned to Beovuk 72 for the 2017–18 Serbian League season. On February 20, he made his debut for Beovuk 72 in a game against Borac Čačak.
He made his Adriatic League debut on March 5, 2018 in a game against Zadar. He left Mega in August 2021.

On September 21, 2021, Mišković signed with Arka Gdynia of the Polish Basketball League. In November 2021, he moved to Montenegrin club Podgorica.

On September 5, 2022, Mišković signed with Greek club Apollon Patras. On December 5 of the same year, he parted ways with the team.

National team career 
Mišković was a member of the Serbian U-18 national basketball team that won the gold medal at the 2017 FIBA Europe Under-18 Championship. Over seven tournament games, he averaged 12.6 points, 5.9 rebounds, and 1.3 assists per game. He was instrumental in the gold-medal game with a game-high 23 points, 4 rebounds, and 2 assists, as Serbia defeated Spain 74–62 after an excellent second-half performance. At the tournament's end, he picked up the Most Valuable Player award and got selected to All-Tournament Team. Also, he participated at the 2016 FIBA Europe Under-18 Championship.

Mišković was a member of the Serbian under-20 team that finished 15th at the 2019 FIBA U20 European Championship in Tel Aviv, Israel. Over seven tournament games, he averaged 7.3 points, 3.6 rebounds, and 2.3 assists per game.

Career achievements and awards

Serbian national team
 2017 FIBA Europe Under-18 Championship:

Individual 
 FIBA Europe Under-18 Championship MVP – 2017
 FIBA Europe Under-18 Championship All-Tournament Team – 2017

Personal life 
Mišković has a younger brother who is also a basketball player. Novak (born 2001) also grew up with the Mega Basket youth system.

References

External links 
 Profile at eurobasket.com
 Profile at draftexpress.com

1999 births
Living people
ABA League players
Apollon Patras B.C. players
Asseco Gdynia players
Basketball League of Serbia players
KK Beovuk 72 players
KK Mega Basket players
KK Podgorica players
Power forwards (basketball)
Serbian expatriate basketball people in Greece
Serbian expatriate basketball people in Montenegro
Serbian expatriate basketball people in Poland
Serbian men's basketball players
Sportspeople from Toruń